James Cregg (born August 18, 1973) is an American football coach who is an assistant offensive line coach for the San Francisco 49ers. He previously was the offensive line coach at LSU.

High school career
Cregg attended and played high school football at Norco High School in Norco, California.

College career
Cregg played college football at Colorado State University. He was an all-WAC offensive lineman in 1995.

Coaching career
Cregg began his coaching career at his alma mater, Colorado State University, where he was a graduate assistant from 1997 to 1999. He was the defensive line coach at Colgate University from 2000 to 2003 at the University of Idaho.  

Cregg served as the offensive line coach at the University of Southern California from 2010 to 2013 and at the University of Tennessee in 2009. Prior to that, Cregg was an assistant offensive line coach with the NFL Oakland Raiders from 2007 to 2008. 

In 2017, Cregg was the assistant offensive line coach for the Los Angeles Chargers. From 2014 to 2016, he was the assistant offensive line coach for the Denver Broncos. During the 2016 season, the Broncos won Super Bowl 50.

In 2019, he coached for LSU as an offensive line coach and running game coordinator, as LSU won the 2020 College Football Playoff National Championship.

On March 7, 2022, it was announced that Cregg was returning to the NFL to become an assistant offensive line coach for the San Francisco 49ers.

References

External links

LSU Tigers bio
Los Angeles Chargers bio
USC Trojans bio

1973 births
Living people
Sportspeople from Riverside County, California
American football offensive linemen
Colorado State Rams football players
Colorado State Rams football coaches
Colgate Raiders football coaches
Denver Broncos coaches
Idaho Vandals football coaches
Los Angeles Chargers coaches
LSU Tigers football coaches
Oakland Raiders coaches
People from Norco, California
Tennessee Volunteers football coaches
USC Trojans football coaches
Players of American football from California
Players of American football from Syracuse, New York
San Francisco 49ers coaches